The 1930 Sheffield Brightside by-election was held on 6 February 1930.  The by-election was held due to the elevated to the peerage of the incumbent Labour MP, Arthur Ponsonby.  It was won by the Labour candidate Fred Marshall.

Previous result and background

Ponsonby had held the seat for Labour since 1922. At the 1929 election he had increased his majority over the second-placed Conservatives from 3,345 votes to over 10,000.

Candidates
The Liberal Party ran William Ashcroft Lambert, a Sheffield solicitor and City Councillor. He had been Liberal candidate here at the last general election
Fred Marshall (Labour Party), an Alderman and wagon builder.
J. T. Murphy (Communist Party)
F. Hamer Russell (Conservative Party), a builders merchant. Russell had been a member of the Liberal Party for 25 years until 1928 when he defected to the Conservatives.

Result

Aftermath 

While Marshall retained the seat for Labour, he would lose it to Russell at the following year's general election. Four years later the pair fought each other for a third time at the 1935 general election, and Marshall regained the seat.

See also 
 List of United Kingdom by-elections (1918–1931)

References

Sheffield Brightside by-election
Sheffield Brightside by-election
1930s in Yorkshire
Sheffield Brightside by-election
By-elections to the Parliament of the United Kingdom in Sheffield constituencies
1930s in Sheffield